Juliano Silva Almeida (born 28 November 1994), simply known as Juliano, is a Brazilian footballer who plays for Bangu as a defensive midfielder.

Club career
Born in Lavras, Minas Gerais, Juliano finished his formation with XV de Piracicaba. He made his first team debut on 3 August 2013, coming on as a half-time substitute for Jonathan Cafu in a 1–0 Copa Paulista home win against São Carlos.

Juliano made his professional debut on 18 February 2014, in a 1–1 away draw against Mogi Mirim for the Campeonato Paulista championship. On 5 August of the following year, he was loaned to Série D club Metropolitano until the end of the year.

After his contract expired, Juliano went on to appear for Olímpia, Penapolense and Santos B in quick succession. In late August 2018, he also took part of the first team trainings after being promoted by manager Cuca.

On 24 January 2019, Juliano was loaned to Ponte Preta for the season.

Career statistics

References

External links

1994 births
Living people
Sportspeople from Minas Gerais
Brazilian footballers
Association football midfielders
Campeonato Brasileiro Série D players
Esporte Clube XV de Novembro (Piracicaba) players
Clube Atlético Metropolitano players
Clube Atlético Penapolense players
Santos FC players
Associação Atlética Ponte Preta players
Bangu Atlético Clube players